Somers High School is a public high school in Lincolndale, New York.

Academics
Somers High School offers a New York State regents curriculum augmented by Advanced Placement courses and a variety of electives. The school has local chapters of the National Honor Society and National Foreign Language Honor Society.

For the 2006–2007 school year Somers had a graduation rate of 100% with 97% receiving a regents diploma and 61% receiving a regents diploma with advanced designation. Of graduating students: 77% enrolled in a 4-year college, 18% enrolled in a 2-year college, 5% became employed full-time, and less than 1% joined the military.

In 2008, Alexander Saeboe won 2nd place in the team competition at the prestigious Siemens Competition in Math, Science & Technology.

Athletics 
Somers High School's mascot is an elephant, and teams' nickname is the Tuskers, both in honor of the town being known for hosting the first American circus.

Baseball
The baseball team had won league titles in 1972, 2000 and 2001. In 2007 the team won the Class A title. The team followed up with another Sectional title in 2008. In 2009 they won the  Section 1 Class A crown.

In 2007 Rob Sanzillo, a Somers High School graduate (class of 2003), was drafted in by the St. Louis Cardinals.

Football
The Tuskers were state champions in 2016. They defeated, previously undefeated, Greece Athena 25–17 at the Carrier Dome to claim Somers first state title in football.

In 2012, the team won the regular season League A title in Class A and won the Section 1 championship. In the 2013 season, Somers won the Section 1 title once again. The 2013 team's record was 9–2.

In November 2021, The Tuskers won the Section 1 Class A championship. Somers defeated Rye High School 26–23 in the fog bowl at Arlington High School.

The former varsity coach, Tony DeMatteo, is the most victorious coach in Section 1 New York State football history, and has been named high school football's most motivational coach of all-time by the NFL.

Ice Hockey
The Somers ice hockey team is merged with that of North Salem High School. In the 2007–08 season, Somers/North Salem had their winningest season in either school's history by finishing 16-9-1 and winning their first ever sectional game against rival JFK/Putnam Valley.

Lacrosse
The boys' lacrosse team has been to eight sectional title games from 2000 to 2010, winning in 2000, 2001, 2002, 2003, 2006 and 2009. The team was also defeated in the NY State semifinals in 2000-2002 and 2006 and in the state title game in 2003.

Since 2002, nine Tuskers have earned All-American honors.

By year: 
2003, 2004, 2005, 2006, 2007, 2008, 2009, 2010, 2011, 2012, 2013, 2014, 2015, 2016.

2009: The Tuskers run to their last Sectional Championship.

Soccer
The girls' soccer team has won five sectional titles and reached the NY State Class A State Semi-Finals in 2006 and 2011. The girls won the Class A New York State Public High School Athletic Association State Championship in 2014. The boys' soccer team won the Section 1 title in 1998 and finished the season ranked fifth in New York State. In 2016, they won the State Championships.

Track and Field
The school's only Track state championship came cross country in 2004. The cross country team also won the sectional title in 2005, 2007, and 2016. The indoor track and field team won the section championship in 1984, 1998, 1999, 2001, 2005–2008, and 2010.

Wrestling
Somers won its first state championship in 2009 in the 103 pound weight class, and won another state championship in 2011 in the 135 lb weight class.

Controversy 
In 2022, Somers School District Superintendent Dr. Raymond Blanch removed an English teacher from the classroom mid-lesson after parents of those students reported being upset at the content she presented as part of an optional activity on racial identity using excerpts from Me and White Supremacy by Layla Saad. Dr. Blanch justified the removal of the text in a subsequent letter to parents by saying the material was previously removed for "approved" curricular use in a prior school year and claimed that the material is not “age appropriate", even though young readers’ edition of the book exists specifically for 10-16 year olds. Dr. Blanch's statement also contradicts the fact that several books that are required reading for 10th grade English classes include topics that may not be developmentally appropriate for minors, including sexual assault (Educated: A memoir (Westover)), drug use (All American Boys (Reynolds, Kiely)), rape, and murder. On November 10th, 2022, the Somers Central School District issued a  letter from Blanch in which he admitted "The English Department was not specifically prohibited from using this text after it had been removed from the summer reading list in June 2021."

In Critical Race Theory Matters: Education and Ideology, Zamudio, Russell, Rios and Bridgeman (2022) assert, “The very notion that race no longer matters is part of an ideology that justifies and legitimates racial inequality in society”. Thus, by silencing those who acknowledge racial inequality, Somers High School took a political stand.

References

External links
School website
School Demographics Report

Public high schools in Westchester County, New York